This is a list of notable people from Antwerp, who were either born in Antwerp, or spent part of their life there.

Born in Antwerp

Pre-16th century
Lionel of Antwerp, 1st Duke of Clarence, son of Edward III of England (1338–1368)
Jacobus Barbireau, composer (1455–1491)
Lucas Adriaens, painter (1459–1493)
Daniel Bomberg, printer (c. 1475 – 1549)
Joachim Sterck van Ringelbergh, scholar, humanist, mathematician, and astrologer (c. 1499 – c. 1556)

16th century

Hieronymus Cockx, painter and engraver (1510–1570).
Hubert Waelrant, composer, teacher, and music editor of the Renaissance (c. 1517–1595)
Frans Floris, painter (1520–1570)
Abraham Ortelius, cartographer and geographer (1527–1598)
Jacques Jonghelinck, sculptor and medalist (1530–1606)
Emanuel van Meteren, historian and consul in London (1535–1612)
Frédéric Perrenot de Granvelle, governor of Antwerp (1536-1602)
Denis Calvaert, painter (1540–1619).
Cornelis van Aarsens, statesman (1545–1627)
Gillis van Coninxloo, painter of forest landscapes (1544–1607)
Hans Collaert, engraver (c. 1545–1628).
Joris Hoefnagel, painter and engraver (1545–1601).
Bartholomeus Spranger, painter, draughtsman, and etcher (1546–1611)
 George de La Hèle (1547–1586) was a Franco-Flemish composer of the Renaissance
Federigo Giambelli, Italian military and civil engineer (c. 1550-c. 1610)
Paul Bril and Matthijs Bril, landscape painters (1554–1626, 1550–1583, respectively)
Martin Delrio, Jesuit theologian (1551–1608)
Andreas Schottus, academic, linguist, translator, and editor (1552–1629)
Jan Gruter, critic and scholar (1560–1627).
Jacob de Gheyn II, painter and engraver (1562–1629)
Joachim van den Hove, composer and lutenist (c. 1567–1620)
Frans Pourbus the younger, painter (1569–1622)
Abraham Janssens, painter (c. 1570–1632).
Ambrosius Bosschaert, still-life painter (1573–1621)
Rodrigo Calderón, Count of Oliva, Spanish favourite and adventurer (died 1621)
Gillis d'Hondecoeter, painter (birth in Antwerp uncertain, 1575/80–1638)
Hendrick van Balen, painter (1575–1632)
Frans Snyders, still-life and animal painter (1579–1657)
Frans Hals, painter (1580–1666)
Caspar de Crayer, painter (1582–1669)
David Teniers the Elder, painter (1582–1649)
Cornelis de Vos, painter (1584–1651)
Jacob Le Maire, Dutch mariner (c. 1585–1616)
Pieter de Carpentier, administrator and Governor-General of the Dutch East Indies (1586/88–1659)
Antonius Sanderus, historian, philologian, and theologian (1586–1664)
Guilielmus Messaus, composer (1589–1640)
Jacob Jordaens, painter (1593–1678)
Clara Peeters, painter (1594–c. 1657)
Jean-Charles de la Faille, Jesuit mathematician (1597–1652)
Justus Sustermans, Baroque painter (1597–1681)
Anthony van Dyck, painter (1599–1641)
Adriaen van Utrecht, painter (1599–1652)
Francken, family of painters (16th and 17th century)

17th and 18th century
Quellinus, family of artists, painters, and sculptors (17th century)
Gaspar Roomer, merchant and art patron (died 1674)
Jan Brueghel the Younger, painter (1601–1678)
François Ykens, painter (1601–1693)
Theodorus Moretus, mathematician, theologian, geometer and Jesuit (1602–1667)
Franciscus van den Enden, Baruch Spinoza's teacher (c. 1602 – 1674)
Leonora Duarte, composer and musician (1610–1678)
David Teniers the Younger, painter (1610–1690)
Jan Fyt, animal painter (1611–1661)
André Tacquet, mathematician (1612–1660)
Gonzales Coques, painter (1614–1684).
Philip de Koninck (1619–1688) & David de Coninck (ca.1644-ca.1701) painters.
Carstian Luyckx, painter (c. 1623 – c. 1675)
Arnold Geulincx (1624–1669), a Flemish philosopher, metaphysician and logician.
Pieter Boel, still-life painter (1626–1674)
Jan van Kessel, senior, still-life painter (1626–1679)
Philip Fruytiers, painter (1627–1666)
Jan Siberechts, painter (1627–1703)
Abraham Brueghel, painter (1631–1690)
Nikolaus van Hoy, Baroque painter, draughtsman, and etcher (1631–1679)
David Teniers III, painter (1638–1685)
Francisque Millet (1642–1679), a Flemish-French landscape painter.
Cornelis Huysmans (1648-1727) a Flemish landscape painter.
Gerard Edelinck, copper-plate engraver (1649–1707)
Emmanuel Schelstrate, Roman Catholic theologian (1649–1692)
Pseudo-Simons, painter (1650–1680)
Jan van Kessel the Younger, painter (1654–1708)
Sebastiaen Slodtz (1655–1726) a Flemish sculptor and decorator. 
Thomas Quellinus, Baroque sculptor (1661–1709)
Jan Frans van Bloemen, painter (1662–1740).
Jan Frans van Bredael, painter (1683–1750).
Peter Scheemakers, sculptor (1691–1781).
John Michael Rysbrack, sculptor (1694–1770)

19th century
Egide Charles Gustave Wappers, painter (1803–1874).
Guillaume Geefs, sculptor (1805–1883)
Hendrik Conscience, writer and author of De Leeuw van Vlaanderen ("The Lion of Flanders") (1812–1883)
Jan August Hendrik Leys, painter (1815–1869).
Jan van Beers, poet (1821–1888).
Johann Coaz, Swiss forester, topographer and mountaineer (1822–1918)
Michel Marie Charles Verlat, painter (1824–1890).
Henri Jean Augustin de Braekeleer, painter (1840–1888).
Julien Dillens, sculptor (1849–1904).
Jef Lambeaux, sculptor (1852–1908)
Georges Eekhoud, novelist (1854–1927)
Libert H. Boeynaems, vicar apostolic of the Hawaiian islands (1857–1926)
Hippolyte Delehaye, Jesuit and hagiographic scholar (1859–1941)
Arthur Van Gehuchten, anatomist (1861–1914/15)
Henry van de Velde, painter, architect, and interior designer (1863–1957)
Eugénie Hamer (1865–after 1926), peace activist
Johannes Jacobus Smith, botanist (1867–1947)
Pierre de Caters, adventurer, aviator, car and motorboat racer (1875–1944)
Eugeen Van Mieghem, painter (1875–1930)
Willem Elsschot, writer and poet (1882–1960)
Camille Clifford, actress (1885–1971)
Constant Permeke, expressionist painter (1886–1952)
Jef van Hoof, composer and conductor, (1886–1959)
Georges Vantongerloo, abstract sculptor and painter (1886–1965)
Jean Langenus, international football referee (1891–1952)
Pierre Ryckmans, head of the Belgian colony of Congo (1891–1959)
Paul van Ostaijen, poet and writer (1896–1928)
Marnix Gijsen, writer (1899–1984)

20th century
Albert Lilar, Minister of Justice (1900–1976)
Gérard Blitz, water polo player (1901–1990)
Lode Zielens, novelist and journalist (1901–1944)
George Koltanowski, chess player and promoter (1903–2000)
Frédérique Petrides, (née Frédérique Mayer) orchestral conductor and publisher (1903–1983)
Karel Bossart, rocket designer (1904–1975)
Maurice Anthony Biot, physicist and founder of the theory of poroelasticity (1905–1985)
André Cluytens, conductor (1905–1967)
Jef Maes, composer (1905–1996)
Georges Ronsse, cyclo-cross and road bicycle racer (1906–1969)
Maurice van Essche, Belgian-born South African painter (1906–1977)
Edmond de Goeyse, student leader (1907–1998)
Jean Servais, actor (1910–1976)
Willy Vandersteen, creator of comic books (1913–1990)
Edward Schillebeeckx, theologian (1914–2009)
Hubert Lampo, writer (1920–2006)
Guy Thys, national football coach (1922–2003)
Jan Yoors, photographer, painter, sculptor, writer, and Gypsy (1922–1977)
Karel Goeyvaerts, composer (1923–1993)
Jacques Sternberg, writer of science fiction (1923–2006)
Ward de Ravet, actor (1924–2013)
Leo Apostel, philosopher (1925–1995)
Bob de Moor, comic artist (1925–1992)
Karel Dillen, politician (1925–2007)
Bobbejaan Schoepen, entertainer, singer, guitarist, composer, and actor (1925–2010)
Paul Van Hoeydonck, printmaker and painter (born 1925)
Victor Mees, footballer (1927–2010)
Jef Nys, comic book creator (1927–2009)
Henry Spira, animal rights activist (1927–1998)
Bob Van der Veken, television actor (born 1928)
Maurice Tempelsman, diamond merchant and industrialist (born 1929)
Jan Vansina, historian and anthropologist (born 1929)
Françoise Mallet-Joris, writer and member of the Académie Goncourt (born 1930)
Bert Eriksson, neo-Nazi and Flemish nationalist (1931–2005)
Simon Kornblit, film studio executive for Universal Pictures (1933–2010)
Marc Rich, international commodities trader (born 1934)
Henry Geldzahler, curator of contemporary art (1935–1994)
Fernando Sanchez, Spanish fashion designer (1935–2006)
Martine Franck, photographer (born 1938)
Harry Kümel, film director (born 1940)
Jean-Baptiste Baronian, critic, essayist, writer, and novelist (born 1942)
Magda Francot, painter (born 1942)
Hugo Heyrman, painter and multimedia artist (born 1942)
Wim Blockmans, writer and professor of medieval history at Leiden University (born 1945)
Ann Christy, singer (1945–1984)
Georges Pintens, road bicycle racer (born 1946)
Guillaume Bijl, artist (born 1946)
Carl Verbraeken, composer (born 1950)
Ronald Zollman, conductor (born 1950)
Anne-Mie van Kerckhoven, painter, drawer, computer and video artist (born 1951)
Ludo Coeck, footballer (1955–1985)
Patrick Janssens, Socialist politician and mayor of Antwerp (born 1956)
Jan Fabre, drawer, sculptor, director, writer, choreographer, and designer (born 1958)
Jan Leyers, singer, songwriter, and television personality (born 1958)
Luc Cromheecke, comic artist (born 1961)
Rita Bellens, politician (born 1962)
Robert C. Hancké, economist (born 1962)
Rudy Trouvé, musician (born 1967)
Els Callens, professional tennis player (born 1970)
Tom Barman, film director, musician, and singer of dEUS (born 1972)
Anke Vandermeersch, politician and former beauty queen (born 1972)
Christian Olde Wolbers, bassist of the industrial metal band Fear Factory (born 1972)
Mike Dierickx, also known as M.I.K.E., DJ and music producer (born 1973)
An Pierlé, pianist and singer-songwriter (born 1974)
Matthias Schoenaerts, actor (born 1977)
Steven De Lelie, actor and director (born 1977)
Jeffrey van Hooydonk, racing car driver (born 1977)
Tia Hellebaut, track and field athlete (born 1978)
Evi Goffin, vocalist of the musical group Lasgo (born 1981)
Dickson Agyeman, football mid-fielder (born 1985)
Laetitia Beck (born 1992), Belgian-born Israeli golfer
Jérémie Makiese (born 2000), Belgian-Congolese singer and footballer who will represent Belgium in the Eurovision Song Contest 2022

Lived in Antwerp

Pre-16th century
Saint Pirmin, monk (c. 670–753)
Lodewyk van Berken, inventor of the scaif (15th century)
Johannes Pullois, Franco-Flemish composer (died 1478)
Matthaeus Pipelare, composer, choir director, and wind instrument player (c. 1450 – c. 1515)
Quentin Matsys, Renaissance painter, founder of the Antwerp school (1466–1530)
Pierre Alamire, music copyist, composer, instrumentalist, mining engineer, merchant, diplomat, and spy (c. 1470 – 1536)
Jan Mabuse, painter (c. 1478 – 1532)
Jacob van Utrecht, painter (c. 1479 – c. 1525)
Joachim Patinir, landscape and religious painter (c. 1480 – 1524)
Richard Aertsz, historical painter (1482–1577)

16th century
John Rogers, Minister of religion, Bible translator and commentator, and martyr (c. 1500 – 1555)
Jan Sanders van Hemessen, painter (c. 1500 – c. 1566)
Tielman Susato, composer, instrumentalist, and publisher of music (c. 1510/15 – after 1570)
Joos van Cleve, painter (c. 1500 – 1540/41)
Damião de Góis, Portuguese humanist philosopher (1502–1574)
Gerard de Jode, cartographer, engraver, and publisher (1509–1591)
Steven Mierdman, printer (born c. 1510)
Gracia Mendes Nasi, wealthy businesswoman (1510–1569)
Hans Hendrik van Paesschen, architect (c. 1510 – 1582)
Johannes Goropius Becanus, physician, linguist, and humanist (1519–1572)
Thomas Gresham, English merchant and financier (c. 1519 – 1579)
Anthony More, portrait painter (1520 – c. 1577)
Christoffel Plantijn, humanist, book printer and publisher (c. 1520 – 1589)
Crispin van den Broeck, painter (1523–1591)
Pieter Brueghel the Elder, painter and printmaker (1525–1569)
Thomas Cartwright, English Puritan churchman (c. 1535 – 1603)
Philippe Galle, designer and engraver (1537–1612)
Philip van Marnix, writer and statesman (1538–1598)
Andreas Pevernage, composer (1542/43–1591)
Jan Moretus, printer (1543–1610)
François d'Aguilon, mathematician and physicist (1546–1617)
Simon Stevin, mathematician and engineer (c. 1548 – 1620)
Federigo Giambelli, Italian military engineer (born c. 1550)
Louis de Caullery, painter (c. 1560 – 1621/22)
Dudley Fenner, English Puritan divine (c. 1558 – 1587)
Jan Vermeyen, goldsmith (c. 1559 – 1606)
Richard Rowlands, antiquary (c. 1560 – 1620)
John Bull, Welsh composer, musician, and organ builder (c. 1562 – 1628)
Cornelis Verdonck, composer (1563–1625)
Jan Brueghel the Elder, also known as "Velvet" Brueghel, painter (1568–1625)
Peter Paul Rubens, painter (1577–1640)
William Cavendish, 1st Duke of Newcastle, English soldier, politician, and writer (c. 1592 – 1676)
Abraham van Diepenbeeck, erudite and painter (1596–1675)
 Ignatius of Loyola, founder of the Jesuit Order

17th and 18th century
Adriaen Brouwer, painter (1605–1638)
Jan Davidszoon de Heem, painter (1606–1684)
Wenceslas Hollar, Bohemian etcher (1607–1677)
Jan Lievens, painter (1607–1674)
Thomas Willeboirts Bosschaert, painter (1613–1656)
Peter Talbot, Roman Catholic archbishop of Dublin (1620–1680)
Charles II of England, king in exile in Antwerp (1630–1685)
Jan Frans Willems, writer (1793–1846)

19th century
Abraham van der Waeyen Pieterszen, painter (1817–1880)
Henri Alexis Brialmont, military engineer (1821–1903)
Lawrence Alma-Tadema, painter (1836–1912)
Albrecht De Vriendt (Ghent, 1843 – Antwerp, 1900), painter of genre scenes, history paintings, interiors and figure paintings
De Vriendt brothers, painters (born 1842/43)
Jan De Vos, mayor (1844–1923)
Vincent van Gogh, impressionist painter, lived in Antwerp for about four months (1853–1890)
Neel Doff, writer (1858–1942)
Walter Osborne, Irish impressionist (1859–1903)
Asriel Günzig, rabbi (1868–1931)
Camille Huysmans, Socialist politician and former Prime Minister of Belgium (1871–1968)
Jules Van Nuffel, musicologist, composer, and expert on religious music (1883–1953)

20th century
Albert Lilar, Minister of Justice (1900–1976)
Suzanne Lilar, writer (1901–1992)
Charlotte Bergman, art collector (1903–2002)
Chaim Kreiswirth, Chief Rabbi (1918–2001)
Jan Cox, painter (1919–1980)
Hugo Schiltz, lawyer and politician (1927–2006)
Françoise Mallet-Joris, writer (born 1930)
Godfried Danneels, archbishop and cardinal (born 1933)
Myriam Sarachik, physicist and recipient of the Buckley Prize in 2005 (1933–2021)
Giya Kancheli, Georgian composer (1935–2019)
Wannes Van de Velde, singer, musician, poet (1937–2008)
Ward Beysen, politician and freemason (1941–2005)
Robbe De Hert, film director (born 1942)
Robert Cailliau, co-developer of the World Wide Web (born 1947)
Roberto Mangou, painter (born 1950)
Luc Tuymans, artist and painter (born 1958)
The "Antwerp Six": Walter Van Beirendonck (born 1957), Ann Demeulemeester (born 1959), Dries van Noten (born 1958), Dirk Van Saene, Dirk Bikkembergs (born 1959), and Marina Yee, fashion designers
Martin Margiela, fashion designer (born 1959)
Matthias Storme, lawyer, academic, thinker, and politician (born 1959)
Stef Bos, singer (born 1961)
Filip Dewinter, politician (born 1962)
Erik Van Looy, film director (born 1962)
Anne Provoost, author of myths, tales, and bible stories (born 1964)
Fons Borginon, politician and lawyer (born 1966)
Stef Driesen, artist (born 1966)
Raf Simons, fashion designer (born 1968)
Mauro Pawlowski, guitar player of dEUS and Evil Superstars (born 1971)
David Palmer, squash player (born 1976)
Matthias Schoenaerts, actor (born 1977)
Veerle Casteleyn, ballet and jazz dancer (born 1978)
Jessica Van Der Steen, model (born 1984)
Rustemi Kreshnik, kickboxer (born 1984)
Yves V, DJ, producer and electronic musician (born 1981)

References

Antwerp
Antwerp

Antwerp